The fourth World Cup of Softball was held in Oklahoma City, Oklahoma between July 16 and July 20, 2009.  The United States won their third World Cup by defeating Australia 3-1 in the Championship game.

Final standings

Position Round

External links
 USA softball website

World Cup Of Softball, 2009
World Cup of Softball